Robert A. King (September 20, 1862 – April 13, 1932) was a prolific early twentieth century American composer, who wrote under pen names including the pen names, Mary Earl, Robert A. Keiser, and Betty Chapin.

Career 
Some authors believe that King wrote the song The Fountain in the Park, credited to vaudevillian Ed Haley. 

In January 1903, King managed the Teachers' Department for Leo Feist Inc., one of Tin Pan Alley's music publishers.

His first hit was ‘’Anona.’’  He collaborated musically with Ballard Macdonald, Billy Moll, Ted Fiorito, Howard Johnson, Gus Kahn, and Charley Straight.

In 1918, King as Mary Earl composed Beautiful Ohio with lyrics by Ballard Macdonald.  A chart topper during the year of its release, it sold more than five million copies for publisher Shapiro, Bernstein, & Company.

Selected works 
You're the Only One (1900)
My Moonbeam Babe (1901)
De Sandman's Coming 'round (1901)
Beyond the Gates of Paradise (1901)
Anona (1903)
The Daisy and the Butterfly (1902)
An Afternoon Tea (1903)
Tell Me, Pretty Maiden (1903)
With Robert Recker. Zenobie: march and two step. (1904) 
Romany Waltz
Gee! What a Wonderful Time We'll Have When the Boys Come Home (1917) 
My Sweetheart is Somewhere in France
’’Lafayette, We Hear you Calling’’ (1918)
From Valley Forge to France (1918) 
With Ballard MacDonald. Beautiful Ohio (1918) Arranged for dance orchestra by Bob Haring in 1936. 
Cheer Up, Mother (1918)
’’Dreamy Alabama’’ (1919)
Ruspana (1919)
Wild flower (1920))
’’In Old Manila’’ (1920) 
’’Love Bird’’ (1921)
Isle of Paradise (1921)
I Ain't Nobody's Darling (1921)
Just Like a Rainbow (1921)
By the Old Ohio Shore (1921)
In Rosetime (When We Said Goodbye) (1922)
Honeymoon Chimes (1922)
I've Got the 'Yes, We Have No Bananas' Blues (1923)
Mississippi Ripples (1923)
The Clock is Playing (1924)
Why Did I Kiss that Girl? (1924)
With Charley Straight. I Need Some Pettin` (1924)
Peter Pan (I Love You) (1925)Seminola(1925)Keep Your Skirts Down, Mary Ann(1925)Tell Me You Love Me (1926)
With Billy Moll, and Howard Johnson. I Scream, You Scream, We All Scream for Ice Cream (1927) and (1928) 
With Marvin Lee. Rocky Mountain Lullaby (1931) 
With Morton Downey, and Sam M. Lewis. An Old Fashioned Home in New Hampshire'' (1931)

References

External links

1862 births
1932 deaths
American composers
American lyricists